The International Society of Sculptors, Painters and Gravers was a union of professional artists that existed from 1898 to 1925, "To promote the study, practice, and knowledge of sculpture, painting, etching, lithographing, engraving, and kindred arts in England or elsewhere...". It came to be known simply as The International. The society organised exhibitions, some for members only and some open to others, and social events such as musical evenings and soirées. The exhibitions were held in a number of London venues, and in other cities around England, including Nottingham and Manchester. Its founder and first president was James McNeill Whistler. On his death, the presidency was taken up by Auguste Rodin, with John Lavery as vice-president. The society contributed £500 towards the cost of Whistler's memorial.

Formation
The society was initially incorporated as The Exhibition of International Art Ltd., but soon changed its name to the International Society of Sculptors, Painters and Gravers. The prospectus issued by the new society read in part:

Members 
Honorary and associate members included:

 Paul Wayland Bartlett
 Alexander Kellock Brown
 Ernest A. Cole
 John Paul Cooper
 Nelson Dawson
 Alfred Drury
 John Henry Monsell Furse
 Alfred Gilbert
 Charles Holroyd
 Thomas Stirling Lee
 David McGill
 Gari Melchers
 Constantin Meunier
 Ernst Oppler
 Glyn Warren Philpot
 Alfred William Rich
 Charles de Sousy Ricketts
 William Rothenstein
 Augustus Saint-Gaudens
 Georg Sauter
 Kathleen Scott
 Charles Shannon
 Franz Stuck
 James Havard Thomas
 John Tweed
 Reginald Fairfax Wells
 Harry (Henry) Wilson

During World War I, the membership of German and Austrian artists was suspended.

Exhibitions
Exhibitions organised by the society included:
 1898: Exhibition of International Art of The International Society of Sculptors, Painters and Gravers; Prince's Skating Rink, Knightsbridge, London, May–July
 1899: Second Exhibition of The International Society of Sculptors, Painters and Gravers; Prince's Skating Rink, Knightsbridge, London, May–July
 1900: No exhibition, on account of the Paris Exposition Universelle of 1900
 1901: Third Exhibition of the International Society of Sculptors, Painters and Gravers; Galleries of the Royal Institute, 191 Piccadilly, London, October–December
 1904: Fourth Exhibition; New Gallery, Regent Street, London, January–March
 1905: Fifth Exhibition; New Gallery, Regent Street, London, January–February
 1906: International Society of Sculptors, Painters and Gravers Exhibition; Nottingham Castle Museum
 1906: Sixth Exhibition; New Gallery, Regent Street, London, January–February
 1907: Seventh Exhibition; New Gallery, Regent Street, London, January–March
 1908: Eighth Exhibition; New Gallery, Regent Street, London, January–February
 1908: Exhibition of Fair Women; International Society of Sculptors, Painters and Gravers, New Gallery, Regent Street, London
 1909: Ninth Exhibition; New Gallery, Regent Street, London, January–February
 1909: Exhibition of Fair Women; International Society of Sculptors, Painters and Gravers; New Gallery, Regent Street, London
 1910: Tenth Annual Exhibition; Grafton Gallery, London, April–May
 1910: Exhibition of Fair Women; International Society of Sculptors, Painters and Gravers; Grafton Gallery, London, May–June
 1911: Eleventh Annual Exhibition; Grafton Gallery, London, April–May
 1911: "A Century of Art, 1810-1910"; Grafton Gallery, June–July
 1912: Twelfth Annual Exhibition; Grafton Gallery, London, April–May
 1912: "Contemporary British landscape"; Thirteenth London Exhibition; Grosvenor Gallery
 1912: "Exhibition of Fair Children"; Grafton Gallery, London, June–July
 1913: The Spring Exhibition; Fourteenth London Exhibition; Grosvenor Gallery, April–May
 1913: The Autumn Exhibition; Fifteenth London Exhibition; Grosvenor Gallery, October–November
 1914: The Spring Exhibition; Sixteenth London Exhibition; Grosvenor Gallery, April–May
 1914: The Autumn Exhibition; Seventeenth London Exhibition; Grosvenor Gallery, October–November
 1915: The Spring Exhibition; Eighteenth London Exhibition; Grosvenor Gallery, May–June
 1915: The Autumn Exhibition; Nineteenth London Exhibition; Grosvenor Gallery, October–November
 1916: The Spring Exhibition; Twentieth London Exhibition; Grosvenor Gallery, May–July
 1916: The Autumn Exhibition; Twenty-first London Exhibition; Grosvenor Gallery, October–November
 1917: Twenty-second Exhibition; Grafton Gallery, June
 1918: The Summer Exhibition; Twenty-third London Exhibition; Grosvenor Gallery, May
 1918: The Autumn Exhibition; Twenty-fourth London Exhibition; Grosvenor Gallery, October–November
 1919: The Spring Exhibition; Twenty-fifth London Exhibition; Grosvenor Gallery, May–July
 1919: The Autumn Exhibition; Twenty-sixth London Exhibition; Grosvenor Gallery, October
 1921: The Annual Exhibition; Twenty-seventh London Exhibition; Grafton Gallery, April–May
 1922: The Annual Exhibition; Twenty-eighth London Exhibition; Grafton Gallery, April–May
 1925: The Annual Exhibition; Twenty-ninth London Exhibition; Royal Academy

References 

Art societies
1898 establishments in England
1925 disestablishments in England
Arts organizations established in 1898